George Douglas Hamilton (15 July 1835 – 29 November 1911) was a New Zealand runholder and station manager. He was born in Antwerp, Belgium on 15 July 1835.

References

1835 births
1911 deaths
New Zealand farmers
People from Antwerp
Belgian emigrants to New Zealand
Belgian people of New Zealand descent